The United States Virgin Islands competed at the 1992 Summer Olympics in Barcelona, Spain. 25 competitors, 20 men and 5 women, took part in 29 events in 7 sports.

Competitors
The following is the list of number of competitors in the Games.

Athletics

Men's 100 metres
 Neville Hodge
 Heat — 10.71 (→ did not advance)

Men's 200 metres
 Wyndell Douglas Dickinson

Men's 400 metres
 Desai Wynter

Men's 5,000 metres
 Marlon Williams
 Heat — 15:26.49 (→ did not advance)

Men's 10,000 metres
 Marlon Williams
 Heat — 31:22.13 (→ did not advance)

Men's Marathon
 Calvin Dallas

Men's 4×100 metres Relay
 Derry Pemberton
 Neville Hodge
 Mitch Peters
 Wyndell Douglas Dickinson
 Keith A. Smith Sr.

Women's 200 metres
 Ruth Morris

Women's 400 metres
 Ruth Morris

Women's 10,000 metres
 Ana Gutiérrez
 Heat — did not start (→ did not advance)

Women's Marathon
 Ana Gutiérrez

Women's Long Jump
 Flora Hyacinth
 Heat — 6.71 m
 Final — 6.52 m (→ 9th place)

Boxing

 
Men’s Light Middleweight...
 Christian Lloyd W. Joseph

Men's Lightweight
 Jacobo Garcia

Men's Middleweight
 Gilberto Brown

Cycling

One male cyclists represented the US Virgin Islands in 1992.

Men's road race
 Chesen Frey

Equestrian

Mixed Jumping Individual
 Charles Holzer

Sailing

Men

Women

Open

Shooting

Men's Small-Bore Rifle Prone (50 m)
 Bruce Meredith

Swimming

Men's 100 m Freestyle
 Laurent Alfred

Men's 200 m Freestyle
 Laurent Alfred

Men's 100 m Butterfly
 Kristan Singleton

Men's 200 m Butterfly
 Kristan Singleton

Women's 50 m Freestyle
 Shelley Cramer

Women's 100 m Freestyle
 Shelley Cramer

Women's 100 m Butterfly
 Shelley Cramer

See also
 Virgin Islands at the 1991 Pan American Games

References

External links
 Official Olympic Reports
 virginislandsdailynews
 

Nations at the 1992 Summer Olympics
1992
Olympics